Grevillea xiphoidea is a shrub of the genus Grevillea native to an area in the Wheatbelt region of Western Australia.

Description
It has dissected tripartite leaves that are deeply divided to midvein. It blooms between June to September and produces an axillary or terminal raceme regular inflorescence with white or cream flowers with white or cream styles.

Taxonomy
The species was first formally described by the botanists, Peter M. Olde and Neil R. Marriott, in 1994 as a part of the work New names and combinations in Grevillea (Proteaceae: Grevilleoideae) as published in the Grevillea Book.
The species has one synonym, Hakea xiphoidea (Olde & Marriott) Christenh. & Byng.

Distribution
The shrub has a limited distribution in the Shire of Merredin and the Shire of Narembeen and is found mostly to the north and east of the town of Narembeen.

See also
 List of Grevillea species

References

xiphoidea
Proteales of Australia
Eudicots of Western Australia
Plants described in 1994